Emircan Altıntaş (born 15 July 1995) is a Turkish professional footballer who plays as a winger for TFF First League club Çaykur Rizespor on loan from Alanyaspor.

Professional career
On 13  January 2020, Altıntaş with Alanyaspor after years at Ümraniyespor. Altıntaş made his professional debut with Alanyaspor in a 1-0 Süper Lig loss to Gençlerbirliği S.K. on 16 February 2020.

References

External links

1995 births
Living people
People from Maçka
Turkish footballers
Alanyaspor footballers
İstanbul Başakşehir F.K. players
Ümraniyespor footballers
Adana Demirspor footballers
Çaykur Rizespor footballers
Süper Lig players
TFF First League players
Association football midfielders